Barry University is a private Catholic university in Miami Shores, Florida. Founded in 1940 by the Adrian Dominican Sisters, it is one of the largest Catholic universities in the Southeast and is within the territory of the Archdiocese of Miami.

The university offers more than 100 degree programs, from bachelors to doctorate, in six schools and two colleges. Barry University has more than 7,000 students, a campus of 54 buildings, a branch campus in Tallahassee, a law school in Orlando, and 50,000 alumni.

History

Beginnings 
Barry College was founded as a women's college by a pair of siblings: Patrick Barry, Bishop of St. Augustine, and his sister, Mary Gerald Barry, OP, then prioress of the Adrian Dominican Sisters. The construction of what was then the Barry College for Women began in 1940, in what had previously been "a tract of tropical vegetation". The empty lot was soon transformed into the main campus in Miami Shores, Florida. The original campus consisted of five buildings. Mother Barry served as president from 1940 to 1961.

Barry College became Barry University on November 13, 1981. Barry University continues to be sponsored by the Dominican Sisters of Adrian, Michigan. It is an independent 501(c)(3) organization and has an independent board of trustees.

Presidents 

The university has had six Adrian Dominican Sisters serve as president since its inception: M. Gerald Barry, 1940–61; M. Genevieve Weber, 1962–63; M. Dorothy Browne, 1963–74; M. Trinita Flood, 1974–81; Jeanne O'Laughlin, 1981–2004; and Linda Bevilacqua,  2004–2019. Mike Allen began his tenure as the seventh president of Barry University on July 1, 2019. He is the first man and lay person to lead Barry University since its founding in 1940. The motherhouse of the sisters is in Adrian, Michigan.

Cor Jesu Chapel 

The Cor Jesu ("Heart of Jesus") Chapel is intended to be the spiritual and physical heart of the campus.  It was financed with the aid of Margaret Brady Farrell, a parishioner of St. Patrick's Church in Miami Beach.  Soon after discovering that the construction of the Cor Jesu was postponed due to insufficient funds, Farrell donated all the funds needed for completion the chapel's construction. In her honor, the Division of Business and Finance building was dedicated as "Farrell House".  The chapel is topped by an  tower holding carillon chimes. It seats 500 persons.  Traces of Romanesque architecture can be seen in the inside of the chapel which "was built in choir style with wood wainscoting and a canopy over the altar". A stained-glass window of amber color, containing the image of a Celtic cross, is visible from the main entrance of the campus.

Facilities 

Barry University's main campus is in Miami Shores, Florida.  While the main campus is in Miami Shores, Barry University offers several continuing adult education classes at other locations in Florida.  Barry University has a campus in Orlando containing the Dwayne O. Andreas School of Law and a campus in Saint Petersburg that has the second branch of its Physician Assistant Program.  Barry University also has a campus on the island of St. Croix, where a third branch of its Physician Assistant Program is located.

There are more than 40 buildings at the Miami Shores campus. These contain technology laboratories and indoor and outdoor sporting facilities.

The Monsignor William Barry Memorial Library contains more than 710,000 items, including 2,600 periodical titles, 5,000 audiovisual items, 150 electronic databases, and an "excellent Catholic American collection". The library also contains a collection of documents pertaining to Operation Pedro Pan.

Expansion 
While Barry University is primarily a liberal arts college, the university has expanded its programs of study to include specialized programs in nursing, teacher education, medical technology, and social work.

Barry began graduate programs for men and women in 1954, a continuing education program in 1974, a school of business in 1976, a division of biological and biomedical sciences in 1983, and a school of podiatric medicine in fall 1985.

In 1999, the Barry University School of Law was established in Orlando, Florida.  Barry University's law school is named the Dwayne O. Andreas School of Law.

Academics 
Barry University offers more than 50 traditional undergraduate programs, accelerated bachelor's programs designed specifically for working adults, and more than 40 graduate programs (many of these with evening/weekend classes) in 9 schools. As of 2019, student to faculty ratio was 12:1.

Schools and colleges
 School of Arts and Sciences
 Andreas School of Business
 Adrian Dominican School of Education (ADSOE)
 Dwayne O. Andreas School of Law (Orlando)
 College of Nursing and Health Sciences
 Barry University School of Podiatric Medicine
 School of Professional and Career Education
 School of Social Work

Branch campus

Rankings 
Forbes' 2015 Ranking of America's Best Colleges ranked Barry University 615th on their list of America's Top Colleges.

Student activities

Athletics 

Barry University became a member of the Sunshine State Conference (SSC) in June 1988 and a member of NCAA Division II since 1984. The Buccaneers have won 16 NCAA Division II national championships (women's soccer 1989, 1992, 1993; volleyball 1995, 2001, 2004; men's golf 2007, 2013, 2014; men's tennis 2010, 2013, 2015; women's tennis 2011, 2014 and rowing 2015, 2016) and 65 SSC titles. The Bucs have produced 309 All-Americans and 361 Scholar All-Americans.

The SSC sponsors championships in 14 sports for men and women: baseball, men's and women's basketball, men's and women's cross country, men's and women's golf, rowing, men's and women's soccer, softball, men's and women's tennis, and women's volleyball.

Multiple alumni of Barry's baseball team have gone on to play Major League Baseball, including pitcher Henry Owens, catcher Yan Gomes, pitcher Tyler Kinley, and second baseman Alex De Goti. MLB pitcher Josh James also briefly attended Barry before transferring to Western Oklahoma State College.

Student organizations 

Barry University has more than 60 student organizations, two fraternities and one sorority, honor societies, and a student government.

Student media 
The Barry Buccaneer is the student newspaper, ranging from 8 to 16 pages, and is published at the first of every month starting in September and ending in May. The Buccaneer serves as a laboratory for journalism minors. All work, including writing, editing, advertising and design, is completed by students.

WBUJ, 99.5 FM, is Barry University's student-run campus radio station. Sponsored by Barry's Department of Communications, WBUJ provides students the opportunity to gain knowledge of radio-industry practices and standards, hands-on technical skills, and marketable on-air experience. Student DJs play all kinds of music, from hip hop to classic rock, classical music to inner city blues. Other programming includes sports shows, talk shows, and daily news.

Campus ministry
Barry has a Department of Campus Ministry. The sacraments of the Catholic Church are administered in accordance with the guidelines of the Roman Catholic Archdiocese of Miami. Protestant and Catholic campus ministers are employed by the university. Protestant Communion is offered monthly in multi-faith services.

Notable alumni

See also 

 Dwayne O. Andreas School of Law
 Independent Colleges and Universities of Florida
 WXEL-TV and WFLV

Footnotes

External links 
 

 
Universities and colleges in Miami-Dade County, Florida
Dominican universities and colleges in the United States
Educational institutions established in 1940
Universities and colleges accredited by the Southern Association of Colleges and Schools
Association of Catholic Colleges and Universities
Catholic universities and colleges in Florida
Roman Catholic Archdiocese of Miami
1940 establishments in Florida